Roger Bates (born 1947) is an American bridge player.

Bridge accomplishments

Awards

 Mott-Smith Trophy (3) 1975, 1988, 1992

Wins

 North American Bridge Championships (12)
 Blue Ribbon Pairs (1) 1971 
 Nail Life Master Open Pairs (2) 1976, 1985 
 Jacoby Open Swiss Teams (2) 1985, 1987 
 Vanderbilt (4) 1975, 1976, 1988, 1992 
 Senior Knockout Teams (1) 2010 
 Keohane North American Swiss Teams (1) 1990 
 Spingold (1) 1976

Runners-up

 North American Bridge Championships
 Blue Ribbon Pairs (2) 1974, 1989 
 Nail Life Master Open Pairs (1) 1977 
 Grand National Teams (2) 1989, 2002 
 Jacoby Open Swiss Teams (1) 2011 
 Truscott Senior Swiss Teams (1) 2011 
 Senior Knockout Teams (1) 2011 
 Mitchell Board-a-Match Teams (2) 1975, 1985 
 Reisinger (1) 1981 
 Roth Open Swiss Teams (1) 2009

Notes

Living people
American contract bridge players
1947 births
Place of birth missing (living people)
Date of birth missing (living people)